Lacydoniidae is a family of polychaetes belonging to the order Phyllodocida.

Genera:
 Lacydonia Marion, 1874

References

Polychaetes